Lex Delles (born 28 November 1984 in Mondorf-les-Bains) is a Luxembourgish politician. , he serves as Minister for Small and Medium-Sized Enterprises and Minister for Tourism in the second Bettel–Schneider Ministry.

References 

Living people
1984 births
Place of birth missing (living people)
Luxembourgian politicians
21st-century Luxembourgian politicians
Democratic Party (Luxembourg) politicians